Rhys Williams (born 27 January 1988) is a Welsh rugby union player who plays at centre for Carmarthen Quins.

Notes

1988 births
Living people
Carmarthen Quins RFC players
Rugby union centres
Rugby union players from Swansea
Welsh rugby union players